Virden (Gabrielle Farm) Airport  is located  south of Virden, Manitoba, Canada.

See also
Virden/R.J. (Bob) Andrew Field Regional Aerodrome
Virden (West) Airport

References

Registered aerodromes in Manitoba